Those Who Caress the Pale is an EP by the Norwegian metal band Ved Buens Ende.

Track listing
"A Mask in the Mirror" – 5:24
"The Carrier of Wounds" – 8:09
"You That May Wither" – 4:36
"The Plunderer" – 5:12
"Those Who Caress the Pale" – 6:17
"Insects (Part I)" – 1:38 (bonus track)

Credits
Vicotnik - Guitars, vocals
 Skoll - Bass, keyboards
Carl-Michael Eide - Drums, vocals

References

Black metal EPs
1997 EPs
Ved Buens Ende albums